Francisco Santos Dela Cruz (March 29, 1962 – January 6, 2019) was a Northern Mariana Islands territorial legislator.

Early life 
Dela Cruz served in the Northern Mariana Islands House of Representatives from 2006 to 2014 and was a Republican. Dela Cruz died suddenly of a heart attack on the island of Tinian, Northern Mariana Islands, while visiting his family with his wife.

Notes

1962 births
2019 deaths
Republican Party (Northern Mariana Islands) politicians
Members of the Northern Mariana Islands House of Representatives